Askow is an unincorporated community in Alberta. It is located at the confluence of the Bow and Oldman rivers, forming the South Saskatchewan River.

Municipal District of Taber